The Bradley Airport Connector (also the Bradley Field Connector) is a  expressway built to connect Bradley International Airport to Interstate 91 in Windsor, Connecticut. It begins at Exit 40 of I-91 and heads west following Route 20 for about 4 miles along the town line between Windsor and Windsor Locks. The expressway then turns north, leaving Route 20 and briefly becoming an unsigned state road (with designation Special Service Road 401) ending at the airport terminals.

On October 10, 1999, the Connector was named the "82nd Airborne Memorial Highway", in honor of the U.S. Army's 82nd Airborne Division. According to the Connecticut Department of Transportation, the expressway carries as many as 54,900 vehicles per day (as of 2007).

Route description
The highway begins at Exit 40 of I-91 in the town of Windsor. After traveling about a quarter of a mile along the exit ramp, the main roadway starts as a four-lane expressway with unnumbered exits. The highway's first exit is with Old County Road a mile later. The second exit is signed for Route 75, which provides access to the long-term parking lots of the airport and leads to the town of Suffield. Soon after this exit, Route 20 exits at the highway's fourth exit to continue on surface roads to East Granby. At this point, the expressway turns north to enter Windsor Locks and soon enters the perimeter of Bradley International Airport. After a partial interchange with Hamilton Road North, the highway ends at Schoephoester Road, a one-way road that connects to the terminal access road.

The highway designation becomes Special Service Road 401 (SSR 401) after Route 20 leaves the Connector. The SSR 401 designation continues east on Schoephoester Road, which continues for another  as a four-lane surface road to connect with Route 75. Schoephoester Road also provides access to the Bradley Airport parking lots. The airport terminal access road connects to Schoephoester Road about half a mile east of the end of the expressway at a jughandle intersection. The airport terminal access road is a one-way, unsigned state road with designation Special Service Road 403 (SSR 403).

History
The project to build this connector was proposed in the early 1950s, but was not started until 1958. Three years later, on July 3, 1961, the four-lane expressway was open to traffic. The highway cost $3.9 million to construct. When the Connector opened to traffic, Route 20 was relocated to use the east–west portion of the highway. This resulted in Route 20 being truncated to end at I-91. The portion of the highway that is not part of Route 20 was assigned as SSR 401 in 1963.

Exit list

References

External links

State highways in Connecticut
Transportation in Hartford County, Connecticut
Buildings and structures in Hartford County, Connecticut
1961 establishments in Connecticut